Bonania is a plant genus of the family Euphorbiaceae first described as a genus in 1850. It is native to the West Indies.

species
 Bonania cubana A.Rich. - Bahamas, Cuba
 Bonania domingensis (Urb.) Urb. - Haiti, Dominican Rep
 Bonania elliptica Urb. - Cuba
 Bonania emarginata C.Wright ex Griseb. - Cuba
 Bonania erythrosperma (Griseb.) Benth. & Hook.f. ex B.D.Jacks. - Cuba
 Bonania linearifolia Urb. & Ekman - Haiti
 †Bonania myricifolia (Griseb.) Benth. & Hook.f. - Guantánamo but extinct

formerly included
moved to Sapium 
B. adenodon - Sapium adenodon

References

Hippomaneae
Euphorbiaceae genera
Flora of the Caribbean